The Soldier Creek Kilns near Stockton, Utah date from about 1873, the time of their construction, and were in use up until about 1899. Also known as the Waterman Coking Ovens, they were listed on the National Register of Historic Places (NRHP) in 1980.

The site includes four smelting kilns which document smelting technology brought from California and from the eastern U.S.  One of the four, the best-preserved, is an eastern beehive-type parabolic-shaped kiln, that would hold more than 10 cords of wood and would be tended from two iron doors.

In 1996, it was argued that these were worth preserving.

The location of the site is not disclosed; they are listed as "Address Restricted", as is done for archeological resources that may be damaged and lose their information potential, if not protected.

See also 
Lime Kilns, Eureka, Utah, NRHP-listed
Charcoal Kilns, Eureka, Utah, NRHP-listed
Frisco Charcoal Kilns, Milford, Utah, NRHP-listed

References 

Archaeological sites on the National Register of Historic Places in Utah
Industrial buildings completed in 1860
Industrial buildings and structures on the National Register of Historic Places in Utah
Buildings and structures in Tooele County, Utah
Kilns
National Register of Historic Places in Tooele County, Utah